KBS De Rietkraag is a Roman Catholic elementary school in Raalte, province of Overijssel, the Netherlands.

External links
 http://www.rietkraag.nl/

Schools in Overijssel
Raalte